Pimethixene is an antihistamine and anticholinergic of the thioxanthene chemical class originally developed to treat hyperactivity, anxiety, sleep disorders, and allergy. It is also used for anesthesia and as a bronchodilator (to dilate the bronchi and bronchioles for more airflow).

In combination with pholcodine, it was sold in France by Laboratoires Salvoxyl in the 1970s as the antitussive Salvodex. Pimethixene alone is still available in Brazil under the trade name Muricalm.

See also 
 Thioxanthene

References 

Piperidines
Thioxanthenes